The 2021 Viaplay Nordic Darts Masters was the inaugural staging of the tournament by the Professional Darts Corporation, and the first entry in the 2021 World Series of Darts. The tournament featured 16 players (eight PDC players and eight regional qualifiers) and was held at the Forum Copenhagen in Copenhagen, Denmark on 17–18 September 2021.

Michael van Gerwen won his 16th World Series event defeating Fallon Sherrock 11–7 in the final. Van Gerwen won his first title overall in 2021, ending a 292 days streak without any tournament win.
Sherrock also became the first woman to reach a televised PDC final (with the exception of the one-off 2010 PDC Women's World Darts Championship).

This was the first World Series of Darts event held in Scandinavia, after the 2020 tournament had to be postponed due to the COVID-19 pandemic.

Prize money
The total prize fund was £60,000.

Qualifiers
The eight invited PDC representatives were announced on 1 September, with the top four ranked players being seeded in the draw.

  (quarter-finals, withdrew)
  (quarter-finals)
  (champion)
  (semi-finals)
  (quarter-finals)
  (first round)
  (semi-finals)
  (runner-up)

The Nordic qualifiers were chosen by various means. The four PDCNB Tour Card holders who were given their places for the original 2020 tournament kept their places (even though Marko Kantele had since lost his Tour Card), the three highest ranked Danish players after the PDCNB Tour events in Iceland on 19–21 August also qualified, and so did the winner of a PDCNB qualifier on 22 August.

Draw

References

Nordic Darts Masters
Nordic Darts Masters
World Series of Darts
Sports competitions in Copenhagen
Nordic Darts Masters